Roly MacIntyre (born December 31, 1943) is a former civil servant and politician in the province of New Brunswick, Canada.  He was elected to the Legislative Assembly of New Brunswick in 1995 and re-elected in 2003 and 2006 after having been defeated in 1999.

MacIntyre was born in Charlottetown, Prince Edward Island. He was district manager for Niagara Finance and Niagara Mortgage & Loan from 1964 to 1971. MacIntyre married Phyllis Coady. In 1971, he joined the federal Unemployment Insurance Commission, moving to Saint John, New Brunswick in 1976 after he became regional manager. In 1978, he became district manager for Human Resources Development Canada. He retired in 1995.

He represented the electoral district of Saint John East (formerly Saint John Champlain from 1995 to 2006) and was a member of the cabinet from 1995 to 1999 and again from 2006 to 2008.

References 

 MLA bio, Government of New Brunswick
 Entry from Canadian Who's Who

1943 births
Living people
Members of the Executive Council of New Brunswick
New Brunswick Liberal Association MLAs
People from Charlottetown
Politicians from Saint John, New Brunswick
21st-century Canadian politicians